The Seamaster 2017 ITTF World Tour was the 22nd season of the International Table Tennis Federation's professional table tennis world tour.

The events for the 2017 tour were split into two tiers: World Tour Platinum and World Tour. The Platinum events offered higher prize money and more points towards the ITTF World Tour standings, which determined the qualifiers for the 2017 ITTF World Tour Grand Finals in December.

On 12 January 2017 it was announced that Chinese shipping company Seamaster had agreed a four-year sponsorship deal with the ITTF World Tour.

Schedule

Below is the schedule released by the ITTF:

Events

Winners

World Tour Platinum

World Tour

Finals

World Tour Platinum

Qatar Open

Japan Open

China Open

Australian Open

Austrian Open

German Open

World Tour

Hungarian Open

India Open

Korea Open

Bulgarian Open

Czech Open

Swedish Open

Standings

Singles

Points were accumulated during the singles tournaments at each of the twelve ITTF World Tour events. The 15 men and 16 women who played in at least five events and accumulated the largest number of points were invited to play in the Grand Finals in Astana in December. Kazakhstan's Kirill Gerassimenko was also invited to take part in the men's singles event, to ensure that the host nation was represented.

Men's singles – final standings

Women's singles – final standings

Doubles

Points were accumulated during the doubles tournaments at each of the twelve ITTF World Tour events. The eight men's pairs and eight women's pairs who played in at least four events and accumulated the largest number of points, as a pair, were invited to play in the Grand Finals in Astana in December.

Men's doubles – final standings

Women's doubles – final standings

Grand Finals

The 2017 ITTF World Tour Grand Finals took place in Astana, Kazakhstan, from 14–17 December 2017.

ITTF Challenge Series

In addition to the twelve ITTF World Tour events, eleven ITTF Challenge Series events also took place in 2017. These events were held in Belarus, Thailand, Chile, Slovenia, Croatia, Brazil, North Korea, Nigeria, Poland, Belgium and Spain. For the first time, the Challenge Series did not form part of the main ITTF World Tour.

See also
2017 World Table Tennis Championships
2017 ITTF Men's World Cup
2017 ITTF Women's World Cup
2017 in table tennis

References

External links
2017 ITTF World Tour
International Table Tennis Federation

2017 in table tennis
ITTF World Tour